Apostol Popov (born 22 December 1982) is a Bulgarian former professional footballer and currently assistant manager of CSKA 1948 III.

Career

Early career
Popov began his career with Spartak Plovdiv and made his first team debut in 2001. Then he played two and a half years in the second division with Belite Orli and Haskovo, before joined Botev Plovdiv in December 2007.

Botev Plovdiv
Popov signed with Botev Plovdiv as a free agent on 27 December 2007 on a two-and-a-half-year deal. He was signed to replace Nikolay Domakinov at Botev and added an extra dimension with his heading ability from set-pieces. He made his official debut in the A PFG with Botev Plovdiv in a match against Spartak Varna on 1 March 2008, playing full 90 minutes. The result of the match was a 2–0 win for Botev.

He scored his first goal on 27 September 2008, opening the scoring in a 5–0 home win over Belasitsa Petrich. On 14 March 2009, Popov played as a goalkeeper for the final minutes in the league game against Levski Sofia after regular goalkeeper Lilcho Arsov was sent off in the 86th minute. He made one good save during the minutes to the end of the game, but Botev lost 0–1.

CSKA Sofia
On 24 July 2009, Popov joined CSKA Sofia on a three-year contract. He made his debut on 23 August, in a 2–0 away win against Sportist Svoge. His first goal came on 10 April 2010, netting the third in a 4–2 win over Sliven 2000 at Hadzhi Dimitar Stadium.

On 13 August 2011, in the second league game of 2011–12 season, against Chernomorets Burgas, Popov ruptured his anterior cruciate ligament and received surgery a week later. His recovery was said to take up to six months. He made his comeback for CSKA from a serious knee injury on 22 April 2012, in a 4–1 win over Cherno More Varna, coming on for the last 2 minutes. This season he played only 6 matches.

In the following campaign, Popov formed a partnership with Plamen Krachunov in the centre of defence, appearing in 26 league matches. He was substituted only once during the entire league season. On 26 July 2012, he scored his first-ever European goal in a 1–1 home draw against Slovenian side ND Mura 05 in the Second qualifying round of 2012–13 Europa League.
 
On 17 July 2013, Popov signed a new two-year contract with CSKA. After serving mainly as a centre back for the majority of his career, during 2013–14 season he started to be employed as the regular right back by CSKA head coach, Stoycho Mladenov.

On 8 March 2014, Popov again played as a goalkeeper for a few minutes in the 1:0 win over Levski Sofia after Raïs M'Bolhi had been sent off in the closing stages of the match.

On 27 July 2014, Popov made his 100th league appearance for CSKA in a 2–0 win against Levski Sofia.

Universitatea Craiova
On 6 June 2015, Popov signed a two-year contract with  Universitatea Craiova.

CSKA 1948
On 13 June 2018, Popov joined Second League club CSKA 1948.

International career
In August 2011, Popov was named in the Bulgarian squad for the first time for a friendly against Belarus. He made his debut in the game on 11 August, coming on for the last 7 minutes in place of Chavdar Yankov as Bulgaria loss 1–0 at Dinamo Stadium in Minsk.

Three years later, on 9 September 2014, in Bulgaria's first match of UEFA Euro 2016 qualification, Popov made his competitive debut in a 2–1 victory away to Azerbaijan at Bakcell Arena, Baku, playing full 90 minutes in the centre of defence.

Career statistics

Club

Honours

Club
 CSKA Sofia
Bulgarian Cup (1): 2011
Bulgarian Supercup (1): 2011
Universitatea Craiova
 Cupa României (1): 2018

References

External links
 
 Apostol Popov at Footmercato.net
 
 

1982 births
Living people
Footballers from Plovdiv
Bulgarian footballers
Association football defenders
FC Spartak Plovdiv players
PFC Belite Orli Pleven players
FC Haskovo players
Botev Plovdiv players
PFC CSKA Sofia players
CS Universitatea Craiova players
FC CSKA 1948 Sofia players
FC Botev Vratsa players
FC Vitosha Bistritsa players
First Professional Football League (Bulgaria) players
Liga I players
Bulgarian expatriate footballers
Bulgarian expatriate sportspeople in Romania
Expatriate footballers in Romania
Bulgaria international footballers